Cornish Lithium is a mineral exploration and development company based in Cornwall, United Kingdom. The company was founded by Jeremy Wrathall in 2016.

Cornish Lithium is building a lithium extraction plant which is backed by the UK Government's Getting Building Fund. The GeoCubed pilot plant will use Direct Lithium Extraction technology to recover lithium from geothermal waters at the United Downs Deep Geothermal Power Project near Redruth. The brine of the United Downs Deep Geothermal Power Project is claimed by Cornish Lithium to be valuable due to its high lithium concentration (220 mg/L), with low magnesium (<5mg/L), total dissolved solids content of <29g/L, and a flow rate of 40-60l/s.

The company also has a hard rock exploration project at Trelavour Downs near St Dennis, Cornwall.

References

External links
 

Lithium mining
2016 establishments in the United Kingdom
Companies based in Cornwall